112 (pronounced "one-twelve") is an American R&B group from Atlanta, Georgia. Formerly artists on Bad Boy Records, the group signed to the Def Soul roster in 2002. They had great success from the late 1990s into the early 2000s with hits such as "Only You" (featuring The Notorious B.I.G.), "Anywhere" and the Grammy Award–nominated single "Peaches & Cream". The group most notably won a Grammy Award in 1997 for Best Rap Performance by a Duo or Group, for featuring on the single by label boss Puff Daddy, "I'll Be Missing You" (alongside Faith Evans).

History

Formation and early years (1993–1997)
The group had its start when the members met while attending high school. The original group consisting of Daron Jones, Michael Keith, and Reginald Finley sang together while Jones and Keith were in middle school and Finley was in high school. Once all three were in high school, they met fellow schoolmate Aldon Lagon who was working at a local McDonald's in Atlanta and added him due to his deep bass voice. They met a high tenor vocalist Marvin Scandrick who sang with them in the school chorus.

Known as Forte, the group performed talent shows and performed at churches and schools around Atlanta. Not soon after Hitmakers Tim & Bob heard of the group and sought after them and started developing them from their living room to the studio in hopes of the duo producers first signing to Rowdy Records ran by they're then boss Dallas Austin. Also Wales was able to secure an audition for the group outside of Atlanta's Club 112 in Buckhead, the boys sang for Combs and impressed him. Following another audition for Combs in front of Bad Boy producer Chucky Thompson, Bad Boy Records artist Faith Evans and Combs' protégé Usher, and a co-sign from Thompson and Evans, Combs signed the quartet of Michael Keith, Marvin Scandrick, Daron Jones, and Quinnes Parker to Bad Boy Records. The group then changed their name from Forte to 112, the name of the nightclub where they had auditioned for Combs.

Soon afterwards, they found themselves living in New York City, recording their debut album, 112. Released in 1996, the album eventually went double platinum. The album, which was primarily produced by Tim & Bob, entered into the top 5 on Billboard's Top R&B/Hip-Hop Albums Chart, going on to sell over two million copies. It featured the hit singles "Only You" and "Cupid", both of which peaked at No. 13 on the Hot 100 and No. 3 and No. 2 on the R&B charts, respectively. The group also contributed to records by several high-profile artists, including The Notorious B.I.G., Sean Combs (as Puff Daddy) and Mase. The group eventually went on the road as the opening act for the Isley Brothers at Ron Isley's request, the first of four separate tours that saw the group criss-crossing the U.S. with Keith Sweat, New Edition, and finally Puff Daddy and the Family, over an 18-month period. In the years that followed, they toured with other performers such as Whitney Houston and Janet Jackson.

Rise to success (1997–2001)

A series of single tracks by 112 populated the charts in 1997, beginning with the Tim & Bob–produced single "Come See Me", which hit the top 40 in January. "Cupid", Produced by Arnold Hennings, released in May, made the top 10 and was certified gold in the same month. By August, "Cupid" went platinum. Another 1997 single, "I'll Be Missing You", hit the top 40 in June and was certified triple platinum by July. Attaining the number-one chart position by August, the song won a Grammy Award for Best Rap Performance by a Duo or Group in 1997. "I'll Be Missing You" sat at the top of the Billboard Hot 100 for eleven weeks and spent nine weeks at the top of the Hot Singles sales. The track also topped the R&B singles, R&B singles sales, and rap singles charts for eight weeks running. The group booked tours with the Isley Brothers, Keith Sweat, and New Edition, as well as with Puff Daddy and the Family, totaling four separate tours. The group spent 18 successive months on the road fulfilling tour commitments.

Their second album, Room 112, was released in 1998 and featured the hits "Love Me", featuring Mase, and "Anywhere", featuring Lil Zane. Both the album and the song "Love Me" were certified gold. Album sales surpassed the platinum level by January 1999, and double platinum sales were recorded in 2002. To continue supporting the album further, 112 went on tour with singer Whitney Houston for her U.S. My Love Is Your Love World Tour in the summer of 1999.

A 2001 single, "It's Over Now", charted at the top of the Hot R&B/Hip Hop Songs. The group's third album, Part III, was released in 2001, spun the hit "Peaches & Cream", and earned the group their first and only Grammy nomination in the Best R&B Group or Duo category. While the group was in production on a new album for 2001, however, executive producer Combs was called to court repeatedly regarding a shooting incident. Instead of taping at the usual accommodations in Combs's studio, 112 went to Nashville, Tennessee, to record the new disc. It was a move that signaled a pending split with Bad Boy Records. The album, Part III, was released on March 20, 2001, following an intensive barrage of advance radio publicity. Even in the absence of Combs, Part III took off with a running start. It raced up the charts to debut at number two on the Billboard  200 chart. Surpassing gold sales in April, the album went platinum in May. To promote the album further, 112 joined Janet Jackson that summer for her U.S. All for You Tour. The upbeat single "Peaches & Cream"—which was credited in part to Combs—scored another crossover hit for the band. Released in June, the track soared to number one on the Rhythmic Top 40 and peaked at number four on the Hot 100. The group earned two award nominations for the song that year: an MTV Best Video nomination in September, and a Grammy nomination for Best R&B Performance by a Duo or Group.

Co-signing with Def Jam (2002–2006)
In 2002, the group members, having matured both personally and professionally, came to the realization that a split with the Bad Boy label was necessary due to the lack of interest. In search of greater creative control, 112 left Bad Boy Records in February 2002 and signed with Def Jam in July on their Def Soul imprint, insisting that the breakup was amicable. They reiterated this no-hard-feelings attitude by going to Diddy's House to record a debut album for Def Jam. Disagreements remained over ownership rights to the 112 catalog of songs, and their fourth album Hot & Wet, the Def Jam debut disc, was waylaid as a result, while negotiations ensued between Lyor Cohen of Def Jam and Bad Boy owner Combs. With both sides ultimately in agreement, Hot & Wet appeared in November 2003, with its title song breaking into Billboard 's Hot 100 and the Rhythmic Top 40 that year. In 2004, the album charted on the Billboard 200 and peaked at number four on the Top R&B/Hip-Hop Albums. The album, however, failed to make any noticeable impression on the charts. From the album, they released "Na, Na, Na", featuring dancehall legend Super Cat.

Pleasure & Pain, the group's fifth album, was released in 2005, eventually reaching platinum status and featuring the popular single "U Already Know". The album is their first to come with a parental advisory sticker, reportedly caused by a rap from Three 6 Mafia, though a few songs on the album also contain profanity. Shortly after the release of the album, though, and amidst rumors of issues regarding money, the members separated to pursue solo careers and were subsequently dropped by Def Jam.

Hiatus and solo projects (2007–2009)
In 2007, 112 formed their own label, One Twelve Music Group, and were in talks with a joint venture deal with Irv Gotti's The Inc. Records imprint to release an album in 2008. The group continued to tour nationally and worldwide whilst they embarked on their own solo projects. Daron Jones was reported to have left the group to pursue a solo career in 2007. However, in 2008, he was seen performing with the group again while overseas in Germany and Belgium.

Slim is featured along with Three 6 Mafia on 8Ball & MJG's second single "Cruzin'" off of their album Ridin High. He has signed his own label deal with Asylum/Atlantic called M3 Productions Inc. and released his solo debut album Love's Crazy in November 2008. He released his first single called "So Fly" , featuring Yung Joc and Shawty Lo.

In an interview with MiddleChildPromotions, Q. Parker confirmed that his debut album would be entitled Real Talk and was due for release in September 2008; it was released in 2009. He was in the studio working with Tim & Bob, The Pirates, Jammy, Bryan-Michael Cox, The Platinum Brothers and Crystal Johnson. The album was released under a joint venture between his own label, NewFam Entertainment, and Drift City Records. The first single off the album is called "Crazy Crazy" and it features Rock City.

Michael Keith decided to leave 112 and go solo. He stated that a former groupmate stole his, and member Slim's, money, causing the two to leave. Slim, however, states that he never fell out with anyone over money and is still with 112. The group now consists of members Q, Slim, and Daron. Mike said his business partner showed him that he wasn't receiving his royalty checks. Mike released his debut solo album, Michael Keith, on September 30, 2008, as a digital download through iTunes and Amazon MP3. He also released two songs, "She's My Superstar" and "Sexy", under the pseudonym "Dangerus" via the internet. In 2010, Michael Keith reconciled with the other three members of 112 and signaled his intention to record with the group on their sixth studio album.

Reunion and Q, Mike, Slim, Daron (2010–2018)
In March 2010, it was announced via Q. Parker that 112 had returned to the studio and was recording new material. He broke the news via Twitter: "In the studio with my boys Mike and Daron! New 112 album comin soon!" The news of the group's reunion was also confirmed by member Daron Jones in an interview published on Sound-Savvy.com. Jones confirmed that the reunion would include Mike and Q, and possibly Slim. He commented, "Slim just didn’t want to be a part of it", but there were rumors that Slim might have had a change of heart, as he had recently recorded a song with the group called "One More Try"; however, Slim would go on to collaborate on the album, although it wouldn't be released until 2017. The yet-to-be-titled album currently doesn't have a release date.

In January 2011, Q. Parker released a 12-month fitness calendar and announced that his solo project wlike be released sometime that year. In March 2012, Daron confirmed that all four members of the group were reconciled and had got back together for a tour titled For The Fans Tour, which kicked off in mid-2012.

In June 2015, the band reunited during the BET Awards to perform at the Bad Boy Reunion segment. Member Slim was present.

In early 2017, the band announced they were releasing a new album. In the summer of the same year, they released their single "Strawberry", followed by the single and music video for "Dangerous Games". On October 27, 2017, the band released Q, Mike, Slim, Daron, their first album in 12 years. The second and final single from the album was "Both of Us" which featured band Jagged Edge and released in 2018.

New Music (2020)
On July 24, 2020, 112 released the single "Spend It All". In an interview with Rated R&B, they described the song as "an ode to women." "Spend It All" is the first single from 112's EP Forever, which they independently released on September 4.

Members

Current
Marvin "Slim" Scandrick (1991–present)
Michael "Mike" Keith (1991–present)

Former
 Reginald Finley (1991–1994)
 Aldon Lagon (1991–1994)
 Quinnes "Q" Parker (1993–2018)
 Daron Jones (1991–2018)

Discography

Studio
112 (1996)
Room 112 (1998)
Part III (2001)
Hot & Wet (2003)
Pleasure & Pain (2005)
Q, Mike, Slim, Daron (2017)
Forever (2020)

Awards and nominations
The Grammy Awards are held annually by the National Academy of Recording Arts and Sciences. 112 has one award from two nominations, so far.

References

16.
https://retroworldnews.com/legendary-group-112-take-their-recent-single-spend-it-all-to-a-whole-new-level-featuring-fatman-scoop-and-69-boyz/

External links

 
African-American musical groups
American boy bands
American contemporary R&B musical groups
Bad Boy Records artists
Def Jam Recordings artists
Grammy Award winners for rap music
Musical groups established in 1993
Musical groups from Atlanta
1993 establishments in Georgia (U.S. state)